Same-sex marriage in Norway has been legal since 1 January 2009 when a gender-neutral marriage law came into force after being passed by the Storting in June 2008. Norway was the first Scandinavian country, the fourth in Europe, and the sixth country in the world to legalize same-sex marriage, after the Netherlands, Belgium, Spain, Canada, and South Africa.

Previously, from 1993 to 2008, Norway allowed same-sex couples to enter into registered partnerships, which provided virtually all the protections, responsibilities and benefits of marriage. Norway was the second country in the world to provide some form of recognition to same-sex couples, after Denmark.

Registered partnerships
Norway introduced same-sex registered partnerships on 1 August 1993. The law was introduced to the Storting on 11 January 1993 by the Ministry of Children and Family Affairs. It passed the lower house on 29 March, and the upper house on 1 April. King Harald V of Norway gave his royal assent on 30 April, and the law took effect on 1 August. Norway became the second country in the world to provide some form of recognition to same-sex couples, after Denmark which implemented a registered partnership law in 1989.

Registered partnerships were granted virtually all the protections, responsibilities and benefits of marriage, including arrangements for the breakdown of the relationship. Initially, the partnership law stated that registered partners could not adopt, and that only married couples or opposite-sex cohabiting couples could access artificial insemination. In June 2001, however, the Storting approved a bill allowing registered partners to adopt their partner's children (i.e. stepchild adoption). The amendment took effect on 1 January 2002. One of the more notable people to enter into a registered partnership was former Finance Minister Per-Kristian Foss.

On 1 January 2009, the ability to enter into a registered partnership was closed off. Couples may retain their status as registered partners or convert their union into a marriage.

Statistics
From 1993 to 2008, 1,485 partnerships between men and 1,233 partnerships between women were registered in Norway.

Same-sex marriage

A bill was proposed on 18 November 2004 by two MPs from the Socialist Left Party to abolish the existing registered partnership law, and make the marriage law gender-neutral. The move was withdrawn and replaced by a request that the cabinet further investigate the issue. The Conservative cabinet of that time did not look into the issue. However, the Stoltenberg's Second Cabinet announced a common, unified marriage act as part of its foundation document, the Declaration of Soria Moria. A public hearing was opened on 16 May 2007.

On 14 March 2008, the Norwegian Government proposed a marriage bill that would give lesbian and gay couples the same rights as heterosexuals, including church weddings (although the law does not oblige any religious community to marry same-sex couples), full joint adoption rights and access to fertility treatments. The new legislation would amend the definition of civil marriage to make it gender-neutral. On 29 May, the Associated Press reported that two Norwegian opposition parties (the Liberal Party and the Conservative Party) had come out in favour of the new bill, assuring its passage at the vote on 11 June 2008. Prior to this, there were some disagreements with members of the three-party governing coalition on whether the bill had enough votes to pass. On 11 June, the lower house (Odelsting) approved the legislation by 84 votes to 41. Norway's upper house (Lagting) passed the bill with a 23–17 vote on 17 June. The King of Norway, Harald V, granted royal assent on 27 June 2008, and the law took effect on 1 January 2009. In addition to providing a gender-neutral definition of marriage, the law states that when a woman who is married to another woman becomes pregnant through artificial insemination, the other partner will have all the rights of parenthood "from the moment of conception".

The first same-sex couple to marry in Norway were Anfinn Bernaas and August Ringmann, together for 25 years, at the Oslo Courthouse in Oslo on 2 January 2009. Article 1 of the Marriage Act was amended to read: Two persons of the opposite or of the same sex can enter into marriage.

Statistics
From 2009 to 2015, an average of 270 same-sex marriages took place per year, compared to an average of 127 registered partnerships from 1993 to 2008. 754 partnerships were converted into marriages in the first three years of same-sex marriage being legal. Female couples were more likely to adopt children than male couples, as about 30% of married lesbian couples had children, compared to 72% of married straight couples and 3% of married male couples.
 
By the end of 2021, 3,712 same-sex marriages had been performed in Norway. Figures for 2020 and 2021 are lower than previous years because of the restrictions in place due to the COVID-19 pandemic.

Marriages in the Church of Norway
In 1781, Jens Andersson, assigned female at birth but identifying as male, and Anne Kristine Mortensdotter were married in a Lutheran church in Strømsø, Drammen. The priest later discovered that Andersson, born Marie Andersdotter, was in fact a biological woman. After examination, Andersson was imprisoned, but later released after the death of Mortensdotter.

In 2014, the National Council of the Church of Norway rejected a proposal to perform same-sex marriages in the church. 

In 2015, the Church of Norway voted to allow same-sex marriages to take place in its churches. The decision was ratified at the annual conference on 11 April 2016. The church formally amended its marriage liturgy on 30 January 2017, replacing references to "bride and groom" with gender-neutral text. A same-sex couple, Kjell Frølich Benjaminsen and Erik Skjelnæs, were immediately married at the Eidskog Church in Matrand the moment the changes came into effect on 1 February 2017.

Public opinion
Five different polls conducted by Gallup Europe, Sentio, Synovate MMI, Norstat and YouGov in 2003, 2005, 2007, 2008, 2012 and 2013 concluded that 61%, 63%, 66%, 58%, 70% and 78%, respectively, of the Norwegian population supported a gender-neutral marriage law.

A 2007 Ipsos MMI poll showed that 61% of Norwegians supported same-sex marriage, and 42% personally knew a gay person. This represented a large increase compared to 1998, when the numbers were 25% and 12% respectively.

A Pew Research Center poll, conducted between April and August 2017 and published in May 2018, showed that 72% of Norwegians supported same-sex marriage, 19% were opposed and 9% did not know or refused to answer. When divided by religion, 83% of religiously unaffiliated people, 72% of non-practicing Christians and 42% of church-attending Christians supported same-sex marriage. Opposition was 14% among 18–34-year-olds.

See also
 LGBT rights in Norway
 Recognition of same-sex unions in Europe

Notes

References

External links
 

LGBT rights in Norway
Norway
Marriage, unions and partnerships in Norway
2009 in LGBT history